"Supermassive Black Hole" is a song by English rock band Muse. Written by Muse lead singer and principal songwriter Matt Bellamy, it was released as the lead single from the band's fourth studio album, Black Holes and Revelations (2006), on 19 June 2006, backed with "Crying Shame".

The song charted at number four on the UK Singles Chart, the highest singles chart position the band has achieved to date in the United Kingdom. In October 2011, NME placed it at number 74 on its list "150 Best Tracks of the Past 15 Years". It was nominated for the Kerrang! Award for Best Single.

Composition and influences
"Supermassive Black Hole" has been described as alternative rock, dance-rock, and funk rock. Bellamy said that the song was "the most different to anything we've ever done." Influences included bands such as the Beatles, and several Belgian bands; Millionaire, dEUS, Evil Superstars and Soulwax. Bellamy said that "these groups were the first to mix R&B rhythms with alternative guitar. We've added a bit of Prince and Kanye West. The drumbeat isn't rocky, with Rage Against the Machine riffs underneath. We've mixed a lot of things in this track, with a bit of electronica; it’s different, slow, quite funky." In an interview with NME, Bellamy said "I was going out dancing in clubs around New York. That helped create tracks like 'Supermassive Black Hole'. Franz Ferdinand would have done it very well, with that dance type beat going on mixed with alternative guitar and I've always wanted to find that."

Music video
The single's accompanying music video shows the band playing in a small furniture shop, clad in masks. This is intercut with images of dancers in Zentai suits which are then unzipped at the end to reveal beings made of space. The video was directed by Floria Sigismondi, who has directed videos for alternative bands such as Marilyn Manson, the White Stripes, Interpol, Incubus and the Cure. Sigismondi described the video as replicating a recurring dream she has experienced, in which dancers wearing masks of their own faces or mirrors and full body suits fill a dark mirrored room. There are also flashes of a black circle, a depiction of a supermassive black hole.

Release
"Supermassive Black Hole" was the first single released from Black Holes and Revelations available on vinyl, CD, DVD, and digital download formats. It peaked at number four on the UK Singles Chart, making it their most popular single released in the UK to date. In the US, it was the third single to be released, on 23 April 2007. The single reached number six on the Billboard Alternative Songs chart, making it the eighth highest-charting Muse single in the US.

B-side
The single's B-side, "Crying Shame", was first performed on 19 December 2004 at the Earls Court Exhibition Centre. The key was changed during the 2005 tour, and the studio track omits the riff found in the earlier live version. The lyrics also appear to have changed, and this is the first studio release in which lead singer Bellamy uses profanity.

Reception
NME gave the song a score of 8.5 out of 10, describing it as "dirty funk guitars rub[bing] saucily against a Prince-ish falsetto over a pink leather couchette". A reviewer on Blogcritics commented that the song has "a bit of a 'disco' feel that some fans may not be expecting". Andrew Perry of The Observer wrote that the song "thunderingly mixes Automatic-era Jesus and Mary Chain with a Prince-like funk, and boasts lyrics like, 'Oo, baby, I'm a fool for you' – not the doings of a gothy navel-gazer."

The song was certified platinum by the Recording Industry Association of America in 2015.

Usage in media
In 2006, "Supermassive Black Hole" featured in the Supernatural episode "Hunted". On 8 May 2008, the song was released as downloadable content for the rhythm game Guitar Hero III: Legends of Rock on the PlayStation 3 and Xbox 360, along with "Stockholm Syndrome" and "Exo-Politics". It was also used in the 2008 teen romance film Twilight during the baseball game sequence, and was subsequently featured on the film's soundtrack. A version of the song was also featured on the soundtrack for the video game FIFA 07, by EA Sports. It was also featured at the beginning of the Series 6 Doctor Who episode "The Rebel Flesh". It was used on a trailer for the television series Castle. It was also used as a wake-up for Space Shuttle Atlantis astronauts on the vessel's presumed final day in space, 26 May 2010. It also appeared in The Sopranos''' sixth season episode "Walk Like a Man", while Tony talks with two boys at the Bada-Bing. The song is available to play on Rocksmith 2014 as part of a Muse 5-song pack. The FX show What We Do in the Shadows then featured the song in the third season episode "Gail" as a parody of Twilight. EA Sports again used the song in their game FIFA 23''.

Track listings

Charts

Weekly charts

Year-end charts

Sales and certifications

References

External links
Supermassive Black Hole at Muse official website

Muse (band) songs
2006 singles
Music videos directed by Floria Sigismondi
Songs written by Matt Bellamy
Song recordings produced by Rich Costey
Warner Records singles
Dance-rock songs
Funk rock songs